Hayley Jane Allen Sotheran (born 25 June 1975) is a British former diver. She competed at the 1992 Summer Olympics and the 1996 Summer Olympics.

References

External links
 

1975 births
British female divers
Commonwealth Games competitors for England
Divers at the 1992 Summer Olympics
Divers at the 1994 Commonwealth Games
Divers at the 1996 Summer Olympics
English female divers
Living people
Olympic divers of Great Britain
People from Pembury